Broughty Wa's or (Burd) Helen (Child ballad # 258; Roud # 108) is a traditional folk song.

Synopsis
Helen is a beautiful heiress, betrothed to Hazelan.  Glenhazlen visits her and is well received, until his men surround her and they carry her off.  She laments that the Highlands are not Dundee or the banks of the Tay.  One day as they go riding, she throws herself in a stream.  He jumps after and is drowned.  She swims off and makes her way back to Dundee.

See also
List of the Child Ballads
Walter Lesly

External links
Broughty Wa's

Child Ballads
Year of song unknown
Songwriter unknown